Estadio Municipal (literally 'municipal stadium') is a generic name for municipally-owned, -constructed, or -operated sport stadia in Spanish or Portuguese -speaking countries.

In Angola:
 Estádio Municipal de Benguela, in Benguela

In Argentina:
 Estadio Municipal de Comodoro Rivadavia, in Comodoro Rivadavia
 Estadio Municipal de Arrecifes, in de Arrecifes

In Brazil:
 Estádio Municipal Gigante do Norte, in Sinop
 Estádio Municipal Radialista Mário Helênio, in Juiz de Fora

In Chile:
 Estadio Municipal de Calama, in Calama
 Estadio Municipal de Concepción, in Concepción
 Francisco Sánchez Rumoroso Municipal Stadium, in Coquimbo
 Nelson Oyarzún Arenas Municipal Stadium, in Chillán
 La Florida Municipal Stadium, in La Florida, Greater Santiago
 Germán Becker Municipal Stadium, in Temuco

In Colombia:
 Estadio Municipal, in Apartadó
 Estadio Municipal Jorge Torres Rocha, in Facatativá
 Estadio Municipal, in Ipiales
 Estadio Municipal de Montería
 Estadio Municipal Gonzalo Marín, in Riosucio (Caldas)
 Estadio Municipal, in Sahagún
 Estadio Municipal, in Yondó
 Estadio Municipal Los Zipas, in Zipaquirá

In East Timor:
 Estádio Municipal de Díli

In Equatorial Guinea:
 Estadio Municipal (Rebola), in Rebola

In Guatemala:
 Estadio Municipal Amatitlán
 Estadio Municipal Mazatenango
 Estadio Municipal de San Miguel Petapa

In Honduras:
 Estadio Municipal San Pedro Sula

In Panama:
 Estadio Municipal de Balboa
 Estadio Municipal de Veraguas

In Paraguay: 
 Estadio Municipal Doctor Julio César Fanego in Mariano Roque Alonso
 Estadio Municipal del Mbeju in Caacupé 

In Portugal:
 Estádio Municipal 25 de Abril, in Penafiel
 Estádio Municipal de Águeda
 Estádio Municipal de Aveiro
 Estádio Municipal de Braga
 Estádio Municipal de Chaves
 Estádio Municipal José Bento Pessoa, in Figueira da Foz
 Estádio Municipal de Leiria,
 Estádio Municipal da Marinha Grande
 Estádio Municipal de Nazaré
 Estádio Municipal de Pombal
 Estádio Municipal de Portimão

In Puerto Rico:
 Estadio Municipal Pedro Román Meléndez, in Manatí

In Spain:
 Estadio Municipal de Chapín, in Jerez
 Estadio Municipal de Ipurua, in Eibar
 Estadio Municipal Pozoblanco
 Estadio Municipal Santo Domingo, in El Ejido
 Estadio Municipal Marbella

In Uruguay:
 Estadio Municipal Doctor Mario Sobrero, in Rocha
 Estadio Municipal de Pando, in Canelones

See also
 Municipal Stadium (disambiguation)
 Stade Municipal (disambiguation)